Kim Kyo-Bin  (born 29 December 1987) is a retired South Korean footballer who played as a goalkeeper.

He previously played for both Jeonnam Dragons and Daegu FC both in the K-League. In 2013, he joined Incheon United in the K League Classic.

External links 

1987 births
Living people
Association football goalkeepers
South Korean footballers
Jeonnam Dragons players
Daegu FC players
Incheon United FC players
Pohang Steelers players
Gyeongnam FC players
K League 1 players